{{infobox military conflict
| conflict          = Incident at Petrich
| partof            = 
| image             = Belasitsa Nature Park 05.JPG
| caption           = Demir Kapia, where the original incident took place.
| date              = 19–29 October 1925 (10 Days)
| place             = Petrich, Tsardom of Bulgaria
| coordinates       = 
| map_type          = 
| latitude          = 
| longitude         = 
| map_size          = 
| map_caption       = 
| map_label         = 
| territory         = 
| result            = Bulgarian diplomatic victory
 Agreement between Bulgaria and Greece under the auspices of the League of Nations
| status            = 
| combatant1        =Support: IMRO
| combatant2        =  Greece | commander1        =  Boris III   Aleksandar Tsankov
| commander2        =  Pavlos Kountouriotis  Theodoros Pangalos
| commander3        = 
| units1            = 
| units2            = 
| strength1         =  10,000 soldiers
| strength2         =  30,000 soldiers
| casualties1       = 55 killed 
| casualties2       =  125 killed
| casualties3       = 
| notes             = 
| campaignbox       = 
}}
The Incident at Petrich, or War of the Stray Dog', was a Greek–Bulgarian crisis in 1925 that resulted in a brief invasion of Bulgaria by Greece near the border town of Petrich after the killing of a Greek captain and a sentry by Bulgarian soldiers.

The incident ended after a decision by the League of Nations.

Background

Relations between Greece and Bulgaria had been strained since the early 20th century by their rivalry over the possession of Macedonia and later Western Thrace, which led to years of guerrilla warfare between rival armed groups in 1904 to 1908 (the Macedonian Struggle) and, a few years later, in the open conflict between Greece and Bulgaria during the Second Balkan War (1913) and the First World War (Macedonian front, 1916–1918).

The outcomes of the conflicts was half of the wider region of Macedonia coming under Greek control after the Balkan Wars, followed by Western Thrace after the First World War by the Treaty of Neuilly.

Most of the population in both regions was Bulgarian and so they remained targets of Bulgarian irredentism throughout the interwar period. Two organisations, the Internal Macedonian Revolutionary Organisation (IMRO) and the Internal Thracian Revolutionary Organisation (ITRO), based in Bulgaria, launched raids and terrorist attacks into Greek and Yugoslav territory.

Petrich was the administrative centre of the Bulgarian-held Pirin Macedonia in which, during the early interwar years, the IMRO practically ran a state within a state. In 1923, Bulgarian Prime Minister Aleksandar Stamboliyski's policies of reconciliation with Yugoslavia threatened its existence and so IMRO played a leading role in his assassination.

Incident

There are two versions of how the incident started.

In the first version, the incident began on October 18 by a Greek soldier running after his dog, which had strayed across the border from Greece at the pass  on Belasitsa (Belles). It is thus sometimes referred to as the War of the Stray Dog''. The border was guarded by Bulgarian sentries, one of whom shot the Greek soldier.

In the second version, the incident was caused on October 18 by Bulgarian soldiers, who crossed the Greek border, attacked a Greek outpost at Belasitsa and killed a Greek captain and a sentry.

Bulgarian and Greek reactions
Bulgaria explained that the firing was caused by misunderstanding and expressed its regret.

In addition, the Bulgarian government proposed the formation of a mixed commission of Greek and Bulgarian officers to investigate the incident, but the Greek government declined as long as Bulgarian troops remained on Greek territory.

The Greek government, led by General Theodoros Pangalos, issued an ultimatum to Bulgaria of 48 hours to punish those responsible, an official apology, and two million French francs as compensation for the families of the victims.

On October 22, 1925, Greece sent soldiers into Bulgaria to occupy the town of Petrich with the objective of enforcing the demands.

International intervention

Fighting between Greek and Bulgarian forces started, and Bulgaria appealed to the League of Nations to intervene in the dispute. Some chetas of Internal Macedonian Revolutionary Organization (IMRO), together with the sentries, organised defence lines against the Greeks near Petrich. Volunteers and war veterans from the whole region were summoned to join the resistance.

Greece made it clear that it was not interested in Bulgarian territory but demanded compensation.

According to some contemporary newspapers, the town of Petrich was captured, but in fact the League of Nations sent a telegraph to both countries to order them to stop their armies, just few hours before the Greeks launched their attack.

The League ordered a ceasefire, Greek troops to withdraw from Bulgaria and Greece to pay £45,000 to Bulgaria.

Both countries accepted the decision, but Greece complained about the disparity between its treatment and Italy's treatment during the Corfu incident at 1923, in which Italy invaded and occupied the island, forcing Greece to pay war restitutions. There was one rule in the League for the great powers like Italy and another for the smaller powers like Greece.

The League Council sent military attaches from France, Italy and the United Kingdom to report to it when the hostilities ceased and to observe the withdrawal of the Greek troops. The attachés also decided that the Bulgarians should not reoccupy the territory until a certain time had elapsed to prevent incidents.

The material and morale damage Greece had to pay was £45,000 (3 million Bulgarian levas) in compensation within two months, while Bulgaria compensated the victim's family.

Over 50 people had been killed, mostly Bulgarian civilians, before Greece complied.

See also
Serbo-Bulgarian war
Tarlis incident

References

External links

The Greek-Bulgarian crisis of 1925 

Conflicts in 1925
Wars involving Greece
Wars involving Bulgaria
League of Nations
1925 in Bulgaria
Modern history of the Blagoevgrad Province
Modern history of Greek Macedonia
Bulgaria–Greece relations
Second Hellenic Republic
1925 in Greece
Internal Macedonian Revolutionary Organization
History of Blagoevgrad Province
October 1925 events